The Battle of Łowicz on August 25, 1656 between forces of the Polish–Lithuanian Commonwealth and Crimean Khanate commanded by Stefan Czarniecki on one side,  and on the other Swedish forces commanded by Hans Böddeker. Polish-Tatar forces won the battle.

References
Leszek Podhorodecki, Rapier i koncerz, Warszawa 1985, p. 324
Mirosław Nagielski, Warszawa 1656, Warszawa 1990, Wydawnictwo Bellona, p. 233

Conflicts in 1656
1656 in Poland
Lowicz
Lowicz
Lowicz
History of Łódź Voivodeship
Battles involving the Crimean Khanate